Novomryasovo (Yañı Meräś) is a rural locality (a village) in Imay-Karmalinsky Selsoviet, Davlekanovsky District, Bashkortostan, Russia. The population was 170 as of 2010. There are 3 streets.

Geography 
Novomryasovo is located 41 km east of Davlekanovo (the district's administrative centre) by road. Staromryasovo is the nearest rural locality.

References 

Rural localities in Davlekanovsky District